Claire Beck Loos (4 November 1904 – 19 January 1942) was a Czechoslovakian photographer and writer. She was the third wife of early modernist Czechoslovak-Austrian architect Adolf Loos.

Biography
Claire Beck was born in Pilsen, Czechoslovakia in 1904, one of three children of Olga (Feigl) Beck and Otto Beck.

Claire became engaged to Adolf Loos (1870–1933) after he invited the Beck family to see a Josephine Baker performance in Vienna in the spring of 1929. They were married in Vienna on 18 July of the same year over her parents' opposition to the much older Adolf. Because it was a mixed marriage (Claire was from a Jewish family, Adolf was not), the Jewish community refused to execute the marriage. They divorced in 1932.

Loos's immediate and extended relations—the Beck, Hirsch, Turnowsky, and Kraus families—and her friends the Semlers were some of Adolf's first clients. They hired him to remodel apartment interiors in Pilsen and Vienna, and it was there that Adolf first began to open up the "interstitial spaces" between walls to create continuous rooms.

In 1936, Loos published Adolf Loos Privat, a literary work of "razor-sharp anecdotes" about her ex-husband's character, habits, and sayings that was illustrated with family photographs. Published by the Johannes-Presse in Vienna, the book was intended to raise funds for Adolf Loos's tomb, as he had died destitute three years earlier.

Loos and her mother were forced to leave Pilsen and move to Prague at the beginning of World War II and were later deported to Theresienstadt concentration camp, Claire in 1941 and Olga in 1942. They were separately transported from there to Riga, Latvia, where they were presumably shot or gassed on arrival in 1942.

Legacy
In 2012-13, some of Loos's photographs were included in the exhibition Vienna’s Shooting Girls: Jewish Women Photographers in Vienna.

In 2011, Adolf Loos Privat was published in its first English translation under the title Adolf Loos: A Private Portrait.

References

1904 births
1942 deaths
Austrian Jews
Czech Jews
Austrian photographers
Austrian women photographers
Artists from Plzeň
Theresienstadt Ghetto prisoners
20th-century Czech women artists
20th-century women photographers
Writers from Plzeň
Austrian Jews who died in the Holocaust
Czech Jews who died in the Holocaust
People who died in the Riga Ghetto